The Hall-Scott A-7 was an early liquid-cooled aircraft engine manufactured by the Hall-Scott company of Berkeley, California. Using a straight-4 configuration, the engine developed 90 horsepower (67 kW) as the A-7 and 100 horsepower (75 kW) as the A-7a. In service these engines suffered from reliability problems and were prone to catch fire while in operation.

Variants
 A-7: The A-7 used the same cylinders as the earlier Hall-Scott A-5. Bore: , stroke: , displacement: , weight: , power:  at 1,400 rpm, weight: 
  A-7a: The A-7a used the same cylinders as the earlier Hall-Scott A-5a.

Applications
 Aeromarine 39 (A-7a)
 Aeromarine M-1 (A-7a)
 Dayton-Wright FS (A-7a)
 Standard J-1

In 2017 about seven A-7a engines were still in use in Edwardian racing cars, mostly in the United Kingdom.

Engines on display
 A Hall-Scott A-7a is on public display at the Aerospace Museum of California.
 A Hall-Scott A-7a is in ownership of the National Air and Space Museum.
 A Hall-Scott A-7a is on public display at the Museum of Flight.

 A Hall-Scott A-7a is on public display at the Hiller Aviation Museum.

Specifications (A-7a)

See also

References

 Gunston, Bill. (1986). World Encyclopaedia of Aero Engines. Patrick Stephens: Wellingborough. p. 73

External links

 Photo of an A-7 at passion-aviation.qc.ca

1910s aircraft piston engines